Upper Musa may refer to either of two Papuan languages spoken in the "tail" of Papua New Guinea:
Orokaiva language
Nawaru language